North Hobbs is an unincorporated community and census-designated place in Lea County, New Mexico, United States. Its population was 5,391 as of the 2010 census.

Geography

Demographics

Education
It is in Hobbs Public Schools. Hobbs High School is the zoned comprehensive high school.

References

Census-designated places in New Mexico
Census-designated places in Lea County, New Mexico